Lloyd Carlton Stearman (October 26, 1898 – April 3, 1975) was an American aviator, aircraft designer, and early aviation entrepreneur.

Biography
Stearman was born in Wellsford, Kansas. From 1917 – 1918, he attended Kansas State College (later renamed Kansas State University) in Manhattan, Kansas, where he studied engineering and architecture.  In 1918, he left school to enlist in the U.S. Naval Reserve in San Diego, California; while there he learned to fly Curtiss N-9 seaplanes.

During the mid-1920s Matty Laird, designer of the Laird Swallow aircraft, hired Stearman as a mechanic, giving him his first exposure to fixed-wing aircraft manufacturing. On February 4, 1925, Stearman and Walter Beech teamed up with Clyde Cessna to form the Travel Air Manufacturing Company. On September 27, 1927, he left to form his own manufacturing company, the Stearman Aircraft Corporation. It was there that he built the Stearman C2 and Stearman C3, and designed other biplanes for mail and cargo delivery, observation and training. Following World War II, many Stearman PT-13 primary trainers were converted to agricultural aircraft; In 1948 more than 4,345 Stearman aircraft were used in agricultural flying.

In 1929, Stearman Aircraft merged with Boeing Airplane Co., Boeing Aircraft of Canada, Varney Airlines, National Air Transport, Pacific Air Transport, Boeing Air Transport, Hamilton Standard Propeller, Sikorsky, Pratt & Whitney, Chance Vought, Northrop and United Airports of Connecticut to become United Aircraft and Transport Corporation, owned by William Boeing. Stearman held the position of President of the Stearman Division until 1931, when he resigned. In 1932, Stearman became president of Lockheed Aircraft Company (now Lockheed Martin Corporation), during which time the Lockheed 10 Electra and Lockheed 12 were designed and introduced.  In 1936, with Dean B. Hammond, he formed the Stearman-Hammond Aircraft Corporation to produce the Stearman-Hammond Y-1.

Stearman died of cancer on April 3, 1975, at home in Northridge, Los Angeles.

Legacy
In recognition of his contributions to the aircraft industry, Lloyd Stearman was inducted into the National Aviation Hall of Fame in Dayton, Ohio in July 1989.

References

External links
 Lloyd Stearman-Aviator, Engineer and Kansan
 The First Stearman

1898 births
1975 deaths
American aviation businesspeople
Aviators from Kansas
Aviation pioneers
Kansas State University alumni
People from Wellsville, Kansas
National Aviation Hall of Fame inductees
United States Navy personnel of World War I
Deaths from cancer in California
United States Navy reservists